Charles Boileau (born Beauvais, France 1648 – 28 May 1704, Paris) was a French ecclesiastic and preacher.

References
Académie française

Members of the Académie Française
1648 births
1704 deaths
People from Beauvais